The 2014–15 Football League is the second division of the Greek professional football system and the fifth season under the name Football League after previously being known as Beta Ethniki. This is the second season since 1982–83, and the third season overall, that the league has more than one group. The groups are created based on geographical criteria.

Notes
Doxa Drama and Aris withdrew from the league before the North Group draw. As a result of this the group left with only 12 teams and Fokikos moved from the South Group to the North Group.

North Group
In the North Group, as well as in the South Group, the top three teams of each group will qualify for a playoff round, to determine which two teams will be promoted to the Super League. The bottom three teams of each group will be relegated. The teams in the 5th - 10th positions of each group will qualify for the relegation playoff round, to determine which six teams will also be relegated. For this season there will be 12 teams relegated in total (the bottom three teams from each group and the six teams from the relegation playoff), in order for the 2015-16 Football League to have only one group of 20 teams.

Teams

League table

Matches

1 The match Lamia vs Anagennisi Karditsa 2–1, later awarded 0–3 w/o against Lamia for fielding a suspended player.

South Group
The same rules from the North Group apply to the South Group.

Teams

League table

Matches

1 The opponents of Paniliakos awarded a 3–0 w/o win each.

Promotion play-offs

Matches

Relegation play-offs

North Group

Matches

South Group

Matches

Season statistics

Top scorers
Updated to games played 14 June 2015

References

Second level Greek football league seasons
Greece
2